The California Dream is the psychological motivation to gain fast wealth or fame in a new land. As a result of the California Gold Rush after 1849, California's name became indelibly connected with the Gold Rush, and fast success in a new world became known as the "California Dream". California was perceived as a place of new beginnings, where great wealth could reward hard work and good luck. The notion inspired the idea of an American Dream. California was seen as a lucky place, a land of opportunity and good fortune. It was a powerful belief, underlying many of the accomplishments of the state, and equally potent when threatened.

Historian H. W. Brands noted that in the years after the Gold Rush, the California Dream spread across the nation:

Overnight, California gained the international reputation as the "golden state"—with gold and lawlessness the main themes.

Migrants

Generations of immigrants have been attracted by the California Dream. California farmers, oil drillers, movie makers, aerospace corporations  and "dot-com" entrepreneurs have each had their boom times in the decades after the Gold Rush.

Part of the "California Dream" was "that every family could have its own private home."

As historian Kevin Starr has pointed out, for many if not most migrants to the golden state, "the dream outran the reality."  The Okies of the 1930s "found their California dream transformed into a nightmare,' notes Walter Stein.  As a result, "the California Dream is a love affair with an idea, a marriage to a myth"

Psychology
Observers report a common stereotyped perception that people are happier in California. This perception is anchored in the perceived superiority of the California climate, and is justified to some extent by the fact that Californians are indeed more satisfied with their climate than are Midwesterners, with much of California enjoying a Mediterranean climate. Surveys of students show the advantages of life in California were not reflected in differences in the self-reported overall life satisfaction of those who live there.

20th century
Historian Kevin Starr in his seven-volume history of the state has explored in great depth the "California Dream"—the realization by ordinary Californians of the American Dream. California starting in the late 19th century promised the highest possible standard of life for the middle classes, and indeed for the skilled blue collar workers and farm owners as well. Poverty existed, but was concentrated among the migrant farm workers made famous in The Grapes of Wrath, where the Joad family, driven out of the Dust Bowl, searches for the California Dream.  By the 1950s the Joads and the other "Okies" and "Arkies" (migrants from Oklahoma and Arkansas) were achieving the dream too.  It was not so much the upper class (who preferred to live in New York and Boston). The California Dream meant an improved and more affordable family life: a small but stylish and airy house marked by a fluidity of indoor and outdoor space, such as the ubiquitous California bungalow and a lush backyard—the stage, that is, for quiet family life in a sunny climate. It meant very good jobs, excellent roads, plentiful facilities for outdoor recreation, and the schools and universities that were the best in the world by the 1940s. James M. Cain, an eastern writer who visited the Golden State, reported in 1933 that the archetypal Californian "addresses you in easy grammar, completes his sentences, shows familiarity with good manners, and in addition gives you a pleasant smile." Cultural phenomena which have fed into the California Dream include the rise of the Hollywood film industry, Silicon Valley, California's aerospace industry, the California wine industry and the Dotcom boom. The phrase has been used in describing Californian's struggles to find a suitable location in the state to achieve success, in 2017, when the cost of living in places like the San Francisco Bay Area were prohibitive.

The phrase "Taking the Cure" was conjured to describe 1950s "u-haul" migrants who, after a year or so pined for home. One drive back home was enough to convince them to stay after all.

Popular culture

The term has been referenced in numerous media, most notably in the song title California Dreamin', with "California dreaming" used in book and film titles that reference some aspect of the California Dream, such as the 2007 film California Dreaming, and the 2005 UK reality TV series California Dreaming. Lawrence Donegan's California Dreaming: A Smooth-running, Low-mileage, Cut-price American Adventure references the California, (and American) Dream. Also referencing it is poet Christopher Buckley's Sleepwalk: California dreamin' and a last dance with the '60s. Numerous songs have been written about the California Dream.

See also
Blue Sky Dream: A Memoir of America's Fall from Grace, related memoir on the California aerospace industry and associated culture
California Dreamin' (disambiguation)
History of California
Californication, the complete opposite of the California Dream.

Further reading
Brands, H.W. The age of gold: the California Gold Rush and the new American dream (2003).  .
Davie, Michael. California: The Vanishing Dream (1973)
Matthews, Glenna. Silicon Valley, Women, and the California Dream: Gender, Class, and Opportunity in the Twentieth Century (2002)
Schkade, David A., and Daniel Kahneman. "Does Living in California Make People Happy? A Focusing Illusion in Judgments of Life Satisfaction," Psychological Science,  September 1998 vol. 9, # 5, pp. 340–46 online version
Starr, Kevin.
Starr, Kevin California: A History (2005), a synthesis in 370 pp.
 Americans and the California Dream, 1850–1915 (1973)
Inventing the Dream: California through the Progressive Era (1986)
Material Dreams: Southern California through the 1920s (1991), cultural, social and political history excerpt and text search
Endangered Dreams: The Great Depression in California  (1997) excerpt and text search
The Dream Endures: California Enters the 1940s (1997)
Embattled Dreams: California in War and Peace, 1940–1950 (2003), excerpt and text search
Golden Dreams: California in an Age of Abundance, 1950–1963 (2009) excerpt and text search
Coast of Dreams: California on the Edge, 1990–2003. (2004). 784 pp.

References

California Gold Rush
Pre-statehood history of California
History of California
American culture
California culture